The 1988–89 Alpha Ethniki was the 53rd season of the highest football league of Greece. The season began on 11 September 1988 and ended on 21 May 1989. AEK Athens won their eighth Greek title and their first one in ten years.

The point system was: Win: 2 points - Draw: 1 point.

League table

Results

Play-off

|+5th place Play-Off

|}

Relegation:

Top scorers

External links
Official Greek FA Site
RSSSF
Greek SuperLeague official Site
SuperLeague Statistics

Alpha Ethniki seasons
Greece
1